Events from the year 1103 in Ireland.

Incumbents
High King of Ireland: Domnall Ua Lochlainn

Died

 Magnus Olafsson (Old Norse: Magnús Óláfsson, Norwegian: Magnus Olavsson; 1073 – 24 August 1103), better known as Magnus Barefoot (Old Norse: Magnús berfœttr)